Gajc is a nature reserve in the Podunajské Biskupice district of Bratislava, Slovakia. The nature reserve covers an area of 62.72 ha on the left shore of the Danube. It has a protection level of 4 under the Slovak nature protection system. The nature reserve is part of the Dunajské luhy Protected Landscape Area.

Description
The protected area was created to safeguard the protection of steppe habitats in the immediate vicinity of floodplain forests.

References

Geography of Bratislava Region
Protected areas of Slovakia